Para Qeshlaq, also rendered as Pareh Qeshlaq, may refer to:
 Para Qeshlaq, Parsabad County
 Para Qeshlaq-e Olya, Bileh Savar County
 Para Qeshlaq-e Sofla, Bileh Savar County